The knockout stage of the 2007 Rugby World Cup began on 6 October with a quarter-final between Australia and England and concluded on 20 October with the final, at the Stade de France in Saint-Denis, Paris, between England and South Africa, their second meeting in this tournament.

South Africa were the first team to qualify for the knockout stage, when they beat Tonga 30–25 in their penultimate Pool A game.

This was the first Rugby World Cup tournament to have its semi-finalists coming from only two pools (Pools A and D), and the finalists coming from just one pool (Pool A). The top two representative nations of each of pools B and C were eliminated in the quarter-finals.

Summary

Quarter-finals

Australia vs England

Notes
 This was England's third consecutive World Cup win against Australia, following victories in the 1995 quarter-final and 2003 Final, and gave them a 3-2 head-to-head winning World Cup record against the Wallabies. Furthermore, England remained the only team to record a Rugby World Cup win over the Wallabies since South Africa beat them in the opening match of the 1995 World Cup.
 Jonny Wilkinson's 12 points in this game took him past Gavin Hastings' record of 227 World Cup points.

New Zealand vs France

Notes
 This was New Zealand's worst World Cup finish; they had never before failed to reach the semi-finals.

South Africa vs Fiji

Notes
This was Fiji's first quarter-final appearance since the inaugural competition in 1987.

Argentina vs Scotland

Notes
 Argentina's win took them into their first ever World Cup semi-final. Scotland had been seeking to reach their second semi-final, after a fourth-place finish in 1991.

Semi-finals

England vs France

Notes
 Josh Lewsey's try, scored after 79 seconds, was the fastest in any match in the knockout stage of a Rugby World Cup and is thought to be the fastest try in England's history.
 Jonny Wilkinson extended his World Cup points record to 243.

South Africa vs Argentina

Notes
 With his second try in this match, Bryan Habana equalled Jonah Lomu's single-tournament record of eight tries.

Bronze Final – France vs Argentina

Notes
This was referee Paul Honiss's 45th test, breaking the record he had previously shared with Derek Bevan of Wales. This record would be surpassed by Jonathan Kaplan in 2008.
French centre David Marty played outside centre despite wearing the #12, David Skrela played inside centre with the #13.
This was the first occasion in Rugby World Cup history where two teams who had played each other in the pool stage met each other later on in the same tournament.

Final – England vs South Africa

Notes
 Jonny Wilkinson's six points in this game made him the leading points scorer in World Cups with 249 points.
 Percy Montgomery finished as the tournament's leading points scorer, with 105 points.
 This was the second occasion in Rugby World Cup history where two teams who had played each other in the pool stage met each other later on in the same tournament, and the first time it had happened in the final.

References

External links
Knockout stage at rugbyworldcup.com

Knockout stage
2007–08 in French rugby union
2007–08 in Irish rugby union
2007–08 in English rugby union
2007–08 in Scottish rugby union
2007 in Argentine rugby union
2007 in Australian rugby union
2007 in South African rugby union
2007 in New Zealand rugby union